Rubén Castillo may refer to:

 Rubén Castillo (footballer), Chilean footballer
 Rubén Castillo (judge), American judge
 Rubén Castillo Anchapuri, Peruvian theologist and biologist
 Ruben Castillo (boxer) (born 1957), American boxer